Sébastien Cuvier (born 9 September 1970) is a French former professional footballer who played as a forward. During a playing career spanning almost 20 years, he assisted 12 different clubs, mostly in the French lower leagues. Cuvier made 13 appearances in Division 2 for Beauvais during the 1991–92 season.

Cuvier is currently the manager of Championnat de France amateur side Jura Sud, having joined the club in October 2008 following the departure of Vincent Poupon.

External links

1970 births
Living people
Footballers from Le Havre
French footballers
Association football forwards
Le Havre AC players
AS Beauvais Oise players
US Avranches players
Bourges 18 players
ES Troyes AC players
FC Istres players
Valenciennes FC players
Pacy Ménilles RC players
ÉFC Fréjus Saint-Raphaël players
Ligue 2 players
Jura Sud Foot players
Stade Poitevin FC players